Each team in the 2017 FIFA Club World Cup had to name a 23-man squad (three of whom must be goalkeepers). Injury replacements were allowed until 24 hours before the team's first match.

Al Jazira
Manager:  Henk ten Cate

Auckland City
Auckland City named their squad on 27 November 2017.

Manager:  Ramon Tribulietx

Grêmio

Manager:  Renato Portaluppi

Pachuca

Manager:  Diego Alonso

Real Madrid 
Manager:  Zinedine Zidane

Urawa Red Diamonds

Manager:  Takafumi Hori

Wydad AC

Manager:  Hussein Amotta

References

External links
 Official FIFA Club World Cup website

Squads
FIFA Club World Cup squads